1956 is an album by hip hop group, Soul-Junk. It was released in July 2000 on 5 Minute Walk. Some tracks were selected to appear on the MTV reality show Road Rules.

Track listing
 Enter Venus
 ill-m-i
Rachel Galaxy: Vocals
Tim Kellett: Violin
 How We Flow
Jason Crane: Trumpet
 Sarpodyl
Brian Cantrell: drums
Rachel Galaxy: Vocals
Rafter Roberts: Banjo, harmonica, key, tone generators, pump organ, croquet mallets/balls, marimba
Tim Coffman: percussion
 3po Soul
Proverbs – 18:12
Rafter Roberts: Vocorder
 Life to False Metal
Nathan Poage: Drums
Rafter Roberts: Background Vocals
 K.I.N.G.D.O.M.O.G.O.D
 Eyes, Externally
Brian Cantrell: Drums
Rafter Roberts: Background Vocals
dj 3rd Rail: Guest Emcee
 Monkeyflower & Yarrow
 Judah
Nathan Poage: Drums
 Pumpfake
 Lordy Child (Say Abba)
Steve Ball: Violin, arrangements
Singers:
Cathleen, Rachel, Jude, and John Galaxy
Christyne, Julia, and Nathan Poage
 Sea Monsters & Gargoyles
Pigeon John: Guest Emcee
 The Peacemaker
Rafter Roberts: Drums
 Dry Bones
Ezekiel – 37:1-28
Jason Crane: Trumpet
Pall Jenkins: Musical Saw, wind machine
Nathan Poage: Drums
Evona Waschinski: Upright bass
 Sweet to my Soul (White Hot Apostle Mix)
Nathan Poage: Drums
 Red Top
Pish Posh: Remix

Credits
Glen Galaxy (MC, guitar, vocals, bass, samples, whistling)
Jon Galaxy (Bass, samples, kaos pad, keys)
Tracking: Tim Coffman (Rolltop Studio), Rafter Roberts
Mixing, Mastering: Rafter Roberts
Artwork: Aaron James, Amy Matthews

Covers
"ill-m-i" was covered by TobyMac on his albums Welcome to Diverse City and Renovating Diverse City.

References

2000 albums
Soul-Junk albums
5 Minute Walk albums